Walking After Midnight is a 1992 Turkish drama film directed by Atıf Yılmaz.

Cast 
 Meral Oğuz - Nilgün
 Lale Mansur - Havva
 Yaman Okay - Nafiz
  - Faruk
 Sema Çeyrekbaşı - Sükran
 Memduh Ün - Ali
  - Hacer
  - Olay

References

External links 

1992 drama films
1992 films
Turkish LGBT-related films
Turkish drama films
1990s Turkish-language films